Korošec is a Slovene surname. Notable people with the surname include:

Anton Korošec (1872–1940), Slovenian politician
Kaja Korošec (born 2001), Slovenian footballer
Miha Korošec (born 1991), Slovenian footballer

Slovene-language surnames